Farey is the surname of:

 Cyril Farey (1888–1954), British architect and architectural illustrator
 John Farey Sr. (1766–1826), English geologist
 John Farey Jr. (1791–1851), English mechanical engineer, son of John Farey Sr.
 Joseph Farey (1796–1829), English mechanical engineer and draughtsman, son of John Farey Sr.
 Lizzie Farey (born 1962), Scottish artist

See also
Farey sequence, a mathematical construct named after John Farey Sr.